Minnesota State Highway 273 (MN 273) was a short state highway in Redwood County. It ran from its intersection with MN 19/MN 67 to its intersection with County State-Aid Highway 9 (CSAH 9) in Belview. The route was decommissioned in 2004 and became an extension of Redwood County State-Aid Highway 7 (CSAH 7).

Route description
MN 273 served as a north–south connector route between the city of Belview and MN 19/MN 67. The entire route was located in Redwood County.

History
Highway 273 was authorized in 1949.

It was removed in 2004 and became an extension of Redwood County State-Aid Highway 7 (CSAH 7).

Major intersections

References

External links

273